Petkovec ( or) is a dispersed settlement in the hills north of Logatec in the Inner Carniola region of Slovenia.

The local church is dedicated to Saint Jerome and belongs to the Parish of Rovte. It was first mentioned in written documents dating to 1526 and was rebuilt in the Baroque style in 1721.

References

External links
Petkovec on Geopedia

Populated places in the Municipality of Logatec